Siwan community development block or simply Siwan Block is a Community development block in district of Siwan in Bihar state of India.

Siwan Nagar Parishad is the headquarter of the block.

Panchayat and Municipality
Siwan block is divided into many Panchayats and a Municipality.

Municipal Council
There is one Municipal council in Siwan district, in Siwan block categorised as Nagar Parishad.
Siwan Nagar Parishad

Gram Panchayats
There are many Gram Panchayats in Siwan block:
Baghra
Baletha
Barhan
Bhanta pokhar
Chanaur
Dhanauti
Jiyaen
Karan pura
Mahuari
Makariar
Nathu chhap
Orma makund
Pachlakhi
Pithauri
Ramapali
Sarsar
Siari
Tanrwa

See also
Siwan district
Siwan Subdivision
Siwan Nagar Parishad

References

Community development blocks in Siwan district